The Journal of Clinical Periodontology is a monthly peer-reviewed medical journal covering periodontology. It is published by John Wiley & Sons. It was established in 1974 by the British, Dutch, French, German, Scandinavian, and Swiss periodontology societies and is an official journal of the European Federation of Periodontology. Articles are published in English. The editor-in-chief is Panos N. Papapanou (Columbia University, New York). Currently, the Journal is ranked  #1 out of 92 in Dentistry, Oral Surgery & Medicine.

Abstracting and indexing
The journal is abstracted and indexed in:

According to the Journal Citation Reports, the journal has a 2020 impact factor of 8.728.

References

External links

Periodontology
Dentistry journals
Monthly journals
Wiley-Blackwell academic journals
English-language journals
Publications established in 1974